The Australian Gridiron League (AGL) is a gridiron competition that forms the highest level of American Football in Australia. The league consists of six state teams from New South Wales, Queensland, Victoria, The Australian Capital Territory, South Australia and Western Australia.

History
The first edition of the competition occurred in March 2012, the inaugural clubs being New South Wales Wolfpack, Queensland Sundevils, Victoria Eagles and Western Australian Raiders.

In the 2013 offseason Gridiron Australia announced that it had suspended operations for the 2013 season and Victoria Eagles but will go ahead with the 2014 season with the inception of Women’s League and new teams the Australian Capital Territory Monarchs and South Australian Swarm for the male competition with the series to be broadcast live via Ascension Sports.

AGL Grand Final Results

WAGL Grand Final Results

See also

Gridiron in Australia

References

External links
 

2012 establishments in Australia
Sports leagues established in 2012
American football in Australia
American football leagues
Sports leagues in Australia
Professional sports leagues in Australia